Dovetail has the mission to improve the quality of every thing. The Australian-born company empowers 85,000+ people from small agencies to universities and Fortune 100 companies, to make sense of their customer research in one collaborative and powerful insights platform.

Users create tags to perform transcription analysis and coding interpretation of interviews, survey responses and feedback, and create summarized insights from their research analysis.

In August 2021, Dovetail raised AU$5 million at a reported valuation of "more than AU$150 million"; raising its valuation fivefold from its prior fundraising round in 2020. Dovetail raised further Series A funding of US$63 million, led by Accel in January 2022.

History

The company was founded in 2017 in Sydney, Australia by Benjamin Humphrey and Bradley Ayers. Both had worked at software company Atlassian, and Humphrey claims he started Dovetail based on his experience working with researchers at the company.

Prior to the company's founding, Humphrey worked on the idea in his spare time, outsourcing the product's development and financing it with a AU$10,000 credit card debt. In 2017 he convinced Ayers to leave his role at Atlassian and join as co-founder. 

Dovetail is part of a cohort of companies founded by former Atlassian employees such as LaunchDarkly, Easy Agile, Pyn, and Code Barrel.

In November 2017, Dovetail was awarded the AU$25,000 minimum viable product grant from the New South Wales Department of Industry Jobs for NSW program. The grant was awarded to fund investment in automatic sentiment analysis features.

In February 2020, Dovetail announced a AU$4 million seed fundraising round led by Blackbird Ventures, with participation from Felicis Ventures and Culture Amp's CEO and co-founder Didier Elzinga to accelerate revenue growth. This raise reportedly valued Dovetail at "close to AU$30 million".

In August 2021, Dovetail announced that it had raised AU$5 million from existing investors Blackbird Ventures, Felicis Ventures, along with participation from Mike Cannon-Brookes' investment vehicle, Grok Ventures.

In January 2022, Dovetail announced it had raised a US$63 million Series A led by Accel. New investors also included Webflow CEO and co-founder Vlad Magdalin, CEO and co-founder of Checkr, Daniel Yanisse, and CEO and co-founder of Slack, Stewart Butterfield.

Dovetail's headquarters will move in 2023 to a new office spanning 4,300 square metres over four levels located on historic Oxford Street.

References

External links 
 Official website

Companies based in Sydney
Online companies of Australia
Software companies of Australia
Technology companies established in 2017
QDA software
Australian companies established in 2017